York Rail Operating Centre (also known as York ROC) is a Rail operating centre (ROC) located at the south western end of  railway station in York, England. The site is one of twelve that will control all signalling across the mainland of the United Kingdom. It was opened in stages from 2014 onwards, with responsibility for signalling becoming active in January 2015. The York ROC accepted the role of its predecessor, the adjacent York Integrated Electronic Control Centre (IECC), in December 2018.

Of the twelve ROC signalling centres that have been built across the regions for Network Rail, York is the largest and controls the London North Eastern (LNE) region which includes the East Coast Main Line between London King's Cross and the Scottish Borders.

History
The centre, along with 13 others, was proposed in 2011 in an effort by Network Rail to combine train control, signalling and level crossing operations. In the project, 14 buildings would replace over 800 mechanical lever and power signalling boxes with Integrated Electronic Control Centres (IECC) also being superseded in the new programme. Preparatory work on the site in April 2012 revealed the foundations of some ex North Eastern Railway roundhouses that were thought to have been built in 1864 and abandoned in 1960. Work on the building was started in September 2012.

The £26 million centre was opened in September 2014 with kitting out 
taking three months so that the first signalling to be transferred there became operational in January 2015. As York ROC will be responsible for the East Coast Main Line (ECML) from King's Cross to the Scottish Borders and the whole of the London North Eastern (LNE) region, (Lincolnshire, County Durham, Northumberland, Tyne and Wear, Teesside and Yorkshire and the Humber), it will take some time for all signalling to be moved there. The last manual signal box is due to transfer to the ROC in 2056 from Morpeth, which should also be the last signal box to be transferred on the entire network.

The ROC is expected to eventually house 400 signallers replacing over 1,000 signallers across the whole of the LNE region. The ROC was built on the former Engineers Triangle to the immediate north west of the station; this area was previously used to turn steam engines, a movement that was able to be retained in York by the installation of a reconditioned turntable to the west of the freight yard in York (a little further north). The ROC at York includes a gym, training centre, welding centre and external rail facilities.

The building is faced externally in brick, whilst the other eleven ROCs are clad in steel and concrete; one of the conditions imposed by the planning permission given to the project was that it had to be in a style befitting to the nature of the City of York. The building won the best design in the Commercial property section at the Royal Institution of Chartered Surveyors Pro-Yorkshire awards in 2015.

The ROC at York will consist of the largest route mileage on the UK mainland railway system. It will "fringe" (adjoin other signalling areas) Glasgow ROC to the north, Manchester ROC to the west, Derby ROC to the south west and Romford ROC to the south east.

Key signalling transfers
The ROC became operational in January 2015 and during the period from 2011 (when the creation of the ROCs was announced) to 2016, many lines were converted to power signal boxes (such as at Lincoln PSB), which will in turn be transferred to the ROC at York at a later date. Network Rail have a rolling programme of signalling upgrades, but those transferred so far include;

This project saw almost  of railway signalling transferred to York, with the demise of 13 mechanical signal boxes.
January and October 2018 - the routes through  and Healey Mills in January and the Calder Valley line (Halifax and ) in October 2018.
Spring 2019 - lines controlled by the former Bowesfield signalbox on Teesside. This included the triangular junction at Stockton Cut and along the Tees Valley Line towards .
Winter 2021 - the Durham Coast line from Stockton to Sunderland. Some former signal boxes were converted to house signalling or level crossing equipment, while Norton East signal box will remain as it is a listed structure.
March 2021 - Sheffield to Shireoaks signalling system upgraded and passed to York with the demolition of Beighton Station Junction signal cabin.
April 2021 - signalling control of the King's Cross power signal box (PSB) was transferred to York ROC at the end of April 2021
November 2021 - signalling from around  railway station
2024 (projected) - implementation of ETCS between Fletton Junction (south of  railway station) and London King's Cross railway station (including the Hertford Loop). This will mean the closure of Peterborough Power Signal Box (PSB), and the transfer of what it controlled into York ROC.

Gallery

See also
Rail operating centre

Notes

References

Sources

External links

Network Rail image of the site

Railway signalling in the United Kingdom
Rail transport in York